Season Finale: The Unexpected Rise and Fall of The WB and UPN is a book written by Suzanne Daniels, former executive President of Entertainment for The WB, and Cynthia Littleton, reporter of Variety and published by HarperCollins. This book explains the details of the history of The WB and UPN.

Summary
Season Finale suggests many reasons for the demise of The WB, including founder Jamie Kellner's departure, the lack of owned and operated stations, a failure to develop many new hits after 2002, Time Warner's decision to merge with America Online and allowing Buffy the Vampire Slayer to move from The WB to UPN for its last two seasons.

See also
List of television shows considered the worst
2007 in television

References

External links
Season Finale: The Unexpected Rise and Fall of The WB and UPN at Amazon.com

2007 non-fiction books
Books about companies
Books about television
The WB
UPN